Mohammed Seisay (born May 22, 1990) is a former American football cornerback. He played college football at Nebraska. Seisay signed with the Detroit Lions as an undrafted free agent in 2014, and played for the Seattle Seahawks, Saskatchewan Roughriders, Memphis Express, and Seattle Dragons.

Early years
Seisay attended West Springfield High School where he helped and contributed to his high school football team reach its first playoff appearance in fourteen years. He recorded 35 tackles, four interceptions, 10 pass defensed along with one forced fumble in 2007 and was named all-district first-team in high school.

College career
Seisay started his collegiate career under Larry Porter at the University of Memphis. He later transferred to Nebraska, where he was named to the Nebraska Scholar-Athlete Honor Roll at Nebraska.

Professional career

Detroit Lions
In 2014, Seisay was signed by the Detroit Lions as an undrafted free agent. On September 20, 2014, Seisay was promoted from the practice squad to the active roster.

Seattle Seahawks
On August 2, 2015, the Lions traded Seisay to the Seattle Seahawks in exchange for a 6th round draft pick in the 2016 NFL draft. Seisay joins the Legion of Boom, consisting of Richard Sherman, Earl Thomas, and Kam Chancellor and Jeremy Lane.

CFL, AAF, and XFL
Seisay signed with the Saskatchewan Roughriders of the Canadian Football League (CFL) on September 11, 2017, but was waived on September 26.  He signed with the Winnipeg Blue Bombers on May 16, 2018, but was released before the start of the regular season on June 10. He signed with the Memphis Express of the Alliance of American Football on February 21, 2019, but was waived on February 27. On October 16, 2019, Seisay was drafted by the Seattle Dragons in the XFL draft. He was placed on injured reserve on March 2, 2020. He had his contract terminated when the league suspended operations on April 10, 2020.

Statistics
Source: NFL.com

References

External links
Nebraska bio
Detroit Lions bio

Living people
1990 births
African-American Muslims
American football cornerbacks
African-American players of American football
Nebraska Cornhuskers football players
People from Springfield, Virginia
Players of American football from Virginia
Detroit Lions players
Seattle Seahawks players
Sportspeople from Fairfax County, Virginia
Saskatchewan Roughriders players
Winnipeg Blue Bombers players
Memphis Express (American football) players
Seattle Dragons players
21st-century African-American sportspeople